Indian School Muladha is an English Medium Secondary School, started in 1991, in a small building with 9 teachers and 90 students. It is now one of the largest interior schools in the Sultanate of Oman with around 2000 students and around 80 staff including teaching and non-teaching.

Location

The school is 120 kilometres away from Muscat on the Muscat-Dubai highway in the South Batinah region. The school is located in a sprawling 16 acres of lush green land in sharp contrast to the desert enveloping it.

Facilities

Classes:        KG I to Class XII classes are taught in Indian school muladha.

Facilities:     Work Experience, Library, Audio Visual Room, Laboratories, Auditorium, Canteen, Remedial Classes, Environmental Classes, Staff transport, Educational trips, Medical Check - Up, Staff Excursion, Activity Room.

Laboratories:   Three fully equipped Science labs, a Math Lab, three Computer Labs and one Audio Visual Room.

Sports:         Playground for games like Cricket, Volleyball, Football, Hockey, Kho Kho, Kabaddi, Badminton, etc.

Extracurricular activities

Kids Lab and Kids Park.
Different clubs are introduced for enrich the hidden talents and innovations of students. For these club activities, last one period of Thursdays of the month are reserved.

class 1 and II

1.Talent Club
2.Science Club

Class III- V

1. Cubs & Bulbuls
2. Mathematics Club
3. Talent club
4. Health & Hygiene Club

Class Vi - X

1. Language Club
2. Mathematics Club
3. Quiz Club
4. Science Club
5. Talent Club
6. Scouts & Guides
7. Health & Hygiene Club
8. Movie Club (Class VI -VIII)
9. Photography Club (Class IX & X)

References

External links 
 Indian School Muladha website

1991 establishments in Oman
Educational institutions established in 1991
Indian international schools in Oman